Antoinette Borg (born 22 October 1988) is a Maltese female professional basketball player.

External links
Profile at eurobasket.com

1988 births
Living people
People from Pietà, Malta
Maltese women's basketball players
Small forwards